Fernande Barrey (9 January 1893 in Saint-Valery-sur-Somme – 14 July 1960 in Paris) was a French artist model and painter.

Biography 
Fernande Barrey left her native Picardy in about 1908 and moved to Paris, where she survived as a child prostitute. She then became the model for many painters, including Amedeo Modigliani and Chaïm Soutine, who persuaded her to study painting and art history at the École nationale supérieure des Beaux-Arts.

In March 1917, she met the Japanese artist Tsuguharu Foujita at the Café de la Rotonde in Montparnasse, who fell madly in love with her and married her thirteen days later. In 1918 the couple moved to escape the German bombs to Cagnes-sur-Mer, where she spent a year painting and meeting many friends. During this period, she became friends with Jeanne Hébuterne, the bride of Modigliani. When Modigliani died of tuberculosis in 1920, Barrey tried in vain to console the new widow, but Jeanne, eight months pregnant, committed suicide.

During the year 1925, the couple led a very open relationship, both having relations with people of both sexes. The painter did not forgive Fernande after she had a love affair with his cousin, Koyanagi, a painter. He then locked himself with the Belgian artist Lucie Badoul (called Youki) for three days during which Fernande desperately sought her husband in the Parisian morgues. In 1928, the couple divorced and she lived with Koyanagi in Montmartre. When Koyanagi was separated himself in 1935, his relationship with Tsugouharu Foujita improved; he helped her financially until her death.

Some sources link Fernande Barrey and the famous Miss Fernande, favourite model of the female photographer Jean Agélou, who appeared on many erotic postcards, although this has never been proven.

As a painter, she exhibited the paintings Josiane and Les Pêches at the Salon d'Automne in 1929.

References

Bibliography 
 
 Christian Bourdon et Jean-Pierre Bourgeron, Jean Agélou : de l’académisme à la photographie de charme, Éditions Marval, 2007. 
 
 
 
 
 
 

1893 births
1974 deaths
People from Saint-Valery-sur-Somme
French artists' models
20th-century French painters
French women painters
French prostitutes
20th-century French women artists